Auburn Manufacturing Inc. is a U.S. company based in Mechanic Falls, Maine. The company produces heat- and fire-resistant fabrics for industrial use, supplying the United States Navy and other customers.

Founded in 1979, Auburn Manufacturing is known for its disputes with Chinese competitors over unfair trade practices. The company manufactures amorphous silica fabric and other products, which it sells to 30 countries.

Leadership 
Auburn Manufacturing is owned by Kathie Leonard, who serves as president and CEO. Leonard founded the company at the age of 27, growing it into a business with two locations and about 50 employees.

Before Auburn Manufacturing, Leonard began her career at a Lewiston, Maine mill that produced an industrial fabric to replace asbestos. She is an advocate for female entrepreneurship, saying that it creates “ladders for women.”

Legal disputes with China 
Auburn Manufacturing is critical of “China’s cheating” when it comes to trade, and the company has secured two legal victories against Chinese competitors. The first victory came in 2017, after Leonard took on China in a trade lawsuit that found silica products to be subsidized by the Chinese government and “dumped” into the U.S. market. The second victory came in 2023, when the U.S. Department of Commerce determined that Chinese dumping negatively affects Auburn Manufacturing and other U.S.-based manufacturers.

Because of Auburn Manufacturing's legal disputes with China, the company works closely with federal lawmakers. In 2022, Sen. Angus King (I-ME) visited one of the company's plants. Auburn Manufacturing also hosted former Rep. Bruce Poliquin (R-ME) in 2016.

References 

Small and medium-sized enterprises
Companies based in Androscoggin County, Maine
Manufacturing companies based in Maine
Mechanic Falls, Maine
American companies established in 1979
1979 establishments in Maine